2020 Oregon legislative election may refer to:

 The 2020 Oregon State Senate election, held to elect 16 out of 30 seats in the Oregon State Senate
 The 2020 Oregon House of Representatives election, held to elect all 60 members of the Oregon House of Representatives